is a city located in Ishikawa Prefecture, Japan. , the city had an estimated population of 50,132 in 18,585 households, and a population density of 600 persons per km².

Geography
Nomi is located in southwestern Ishikawa Prefecture and is bordered by the Sea of Japan to the east.

Neighbouring municipalities 
Ishikawa Prefecture
Komatsu
Hakusan
Kawakita

Climate
Nomi has a humid continental climate (Köppen Cfa) characterized by mild summers and cold winters with heavy snowfall.  The average annual temperature in Nomi is 14.1 °C. The average annual rainfall is 2,527 mm with September as the wettest month. The temperatures are highest on average in August, at around 26.8 °C, and lowest in January, at around 2.7 °C.

Demographics
Per Japanese census data, the population of Nomi has recently plateaued after a long period of growth.

History 
The area around Nomi was part of ancient Kaga Province and contains numerous Kofun period ruins. The area became part Kaga Domain under the Edo period Tokugawa shogunate. Following the Meiji restoration, the area was organised into Nomi District, Ishikawa. The town of Nomi was established with the creation of the modern municipalities system on April 1, 1889.

The modern city of Nomi was established on February 1, 2005, from the merger of the towns of Neagari, Tatsunokuchi and Terai.

Government
Nomi has a mayor-council form of government with a directly elected mayor and a unicameral city legislature of 17 members.

Economy 
Former Terai town was a noted centre of Kutani ware ceramics production in the past. Manufacturing of electrical components and textiles are major contributors to the modern local economy.

Education
Nomi has eight public elementary schools and three middle schools operated by the city government, and one public high school operated by the Ishikawa Prefectural Board of Education. There is also one private high school. The Japan Advanced Institute of Science and Technology (JAIST Hokuriku) is also located in Nomi.

Transportation

Railway
  West Japan Railway Company - Hokuriku Main Line

Highway
 Hokuriku Expressway

Sister city relations
  - Shelekhov, Irkutsk Oblast (Russia)

Local attractions
 Hideki Matsui Baseball Museum (:ja:松井秀喜ベースボールミュージアム)
 Tedori Fish Land (:ja:手取フィッシュランド)
 Tumulus Wada-yama and Matsuji-yama
 Tumulus Akitsune-yama - Keyhole-shaped tomb.
 Ishikawa Zoo (:ja:いしかわ動物園)
 Tatsunokuchi Onsen (辰口温泉) - Spa.

Local events
Asian Race Walking Championships, held annually

Noted people from Nomi
 Hideki Matsui, baseball player
 Yoshirō Mori, former prime minister
 Shigeki Mori, town mayor of Neagari - Mori was responsible for Neagari's sister town relationship with Shelekhov, Russia, developing a bilateral dialogue to improve the gravesites of Soviet soldiers in Japan and Japanese soldiers in Siberia. He visited Shelekhov more than 15 times during his 35 years in office, and was buried there following his death. His son, Yoshiro Mori, became prime minister and made major strides in Russo-Japanese relations.
 Mamoru Sasaki,  Japanese TV and film screenwriter
 Yusuke Suzuki, racewalker

References

External links 

  

 
Cities in Ishikawa Prefecture
Populated coastal places in Japan